Yasutarō, Yasutaro or Yasutarou is a masculine Japanese given name.

Possible writings
Yasutarō can be written using many different combinations of kanji characters. Here are some examples:

The characters used for "taro" (太郎) literally means "thick (big) son" and usually used as a suffix to a masculine name, especially for the first son. The "yasu" part of the name can use a variety of characters, each of which will change the meaning of the name ("靖" for peaceful, "保" for preserve, "易" and so on).

靖太郎, "peaceful, big son"
保太郎, "preserve, big son"
易太郎, "divination, big son"
安太郎, "tranquil, big son"

Other combinations...

靖太朗, "peaceful, thick, bright"
靖多朗, "peaceful, many, bright"
靖汰朗, "peaceful, excessive, bright"
保太朗, "preserve, thick, bright"
安多朗, "tranquil, many, bright"

The name can also be written in hiragana やすたろう or katakana ヤスタロウ.

Notable people with the name
, Anglican bishop
, Japanese supercentenarian
, Japanese footballer and manager
, Japanese water polo player
, Japanese screenwriter

Japanese masculine given names